Diplocalyptis triangulifera is a moth of the family Tortricidae which is endemic to Vietnam.

The ground colour of the forewings is brownish cream, darkening towards the base of the wing. The dots are brownish and the suffusion at the mid-dorsum is paler and spotted brown. The markings are grey-brown. The hindwings are pale brownish.

Etymology
The specific name refers to the subterminal blotch of the forewing and is derived from Latin triangulum (meaning triangle) and ferre (meaning "I carry").

References

Archipini
Moths of Asia
Endemic fauna of Vietnam
Moths described in 2009
Taxa named by Józef Razowski